The Battle of Infernal Caverns was a battle during the Snake War fought between Native Americans and the U.S. Army.  The Native American warriors had made a fortress out of lava rocks in the Infernal Caverns of northern California near the town of Likely.  From there they were able to pour a steady fire upon the soldiers commanded by Lt. Col. George Crook.  Crook's men attacked on the second day.  Despite heavy casualties they managed to scale the cliffs and take the fortifications.  Colonel Crook reportedly shot down Chief Sieto himself. Fighting continued into the night as the Native warriors withdrew deeper into the caverns. Crook commented, "I never wanted dynamite so bad as I did when we first took the fort and heard the diabolical and defiant yells from down in the rocks". On the third day the Natives had fled the caverns.

Notes

References

 The Snake War, 1864-1868, Idaho State Historical Society Reference Series #236, 1966

Infernal Caverns
1867 in California
Infernal Caverns
Snake War
Infernal Caverns